Brett Paesel is an American actress and author. She is married with two children. She played in Top Girls, and was a recurring cast member in Amazon Studios’ Transparent. She was also a recurring cast member on Mr. Show with Bob and David.

Her 2006 book Mommies Who Drink: Sex, Drugs, and Other Distant Memories of an Ordinary Mom, is a polemic against modern mothering; reportedly, the book was banned in Oregon. She also contributes to The New York Times.

Bibliography
 Mommies Who Drink: Sex, Drugs, and Other Distant Memories of an Ordinary Mom, Warner Books (2006)

References

External links
 
 Author Bio
 Excerpt from Mommies Who Drink

Year of birth missing (living people)
Living people
American screenwriters
American women screenwriters
Place of birth missing (living people)
21st-century American women